De Witt Clinton Badger (August 7, 1858 – May 20, 1926) was a U.S. Representative from Ohio and the 36th mayor of Columbus, Ohio.

Born near London, Ohio, Badger attended the country schools in Madison County and Mount Union College, Alliance, Ohio.
He taught school from 1875 to 1880.
He studied law.
He was admitted to the bar in 1881 and commenced practice in London, Ohio.
He served as prosecuting attorney of Madison County 1882–1885.
He moved to Columbus, Ohio, and was elected judge of the court of common pleas in 1893.
He was reelected in 1897 and served until 1903, when he resigned, having been elected to Congress.

Badger was elected as a Democrat to the Fifty-eighth Congress (March 4, 1903 – March 3, 1905).
He declined to be a candidate for renomination in 1904.
He resumed the practice of law in Columbus, Ohio.
He served as the 36th mayor of Columbus (January 1, 1906 – 1908).
He died in Columbus, Ohio, May 20, 1926.
He was interred at Green Lawn Cemetery in Columbus, Ohio.
Badger married Sidney Slaughter, and had children named Clinton and Minnie.

Sources

External links 

De Witt C. Badger at Political Graveyard

1858 births
1926 deaths
People from London, Ohio
University of Mount Union alumni
Mayors of Columbus, Ohio
County district attorneys in Ohio
Democratic Party members of the United States House of Representatives from Ohio
Burials at Green Lawn Cemetery (Columbus, Ohio)
Educators from Ohio